The Woolcock Institute of Medical Research (WIMR) is an Australian medical research institute that is focused on the prevention and treatment of sleep and respiratory disorders, lung cancer, and tuberculosis.

History and facilities
The institute was founded in 1981 by then Prof. Ann Woolcock, a professor of respiratory medicine/science at the Sydney Medical School and was originally called the Institute of Respiratory Medicine. The Institute was renamed in memory of Woolcock in 2002 after her passing in 2001. The research institute has collaborative agreements with the Hunter Area Health Service, the University of Newcastle, and Liverpool, Concord and Royal North Shore Hospitals.

Originally, the Woolcock Institute of Medical Research was located within the Royal Prince Alfred Hospital in Camperdown before it was relocated to a custom-built building in Glebe in 2008. In addition to research facilities, including offices, "wet-lab" laboratories and sleep laboratories, there are also consulting rooms for doctors' clinics.

See also

 Health in Australia
 Sleep disorder

References

External links
 

1981 establishments in Australia
Lung disease organizations
Medical research institutes in Sydney
Research institutes established in 1981
Tuberculosis organizations